Jarrod Fletcher (born 20 October 1983) is an Australian professional boxer and a former world middleweight title challenger. As an amateur he won a gold medal at the 2006 Commonwealth Games in the middleweight division.

School 
 Secondary Education: Urangan State High School, Hervey Bay, QLD.

Coaches
 Boxing Coaches:
  Dave Fletcher (1994–2002), 
  Bodo Andreass (2002–2008) (AIS), 
  Steve Deller (2009–present)

Achievements
 Brothers Glenn and Rob were Australian Junior Champions and have fought on the world stage across many countries representing Australia.
 Jarrod was also a promising soccer player, representing his state of Queensland at the age of 13. He showed talent in the sport but rather than juggle Boxing and soccer, he decided at the age of 15 to concentrate solely on boxing.
 Jarrod has worked as a personal trainer since 2004, and has put the Queensland Maroons Team through their paces at the Fortitude Boxing Gymnasium in the lead up to the 2010 and 2011 NRL 'State of Origin' Series. Jarrod has been appointed part-time boxing coach for the Brisbane Lions AFL Team for 2012 and 2013.

Professional boxing record

References

External links
 
Bio
Oceania

Middleweight boxers
1983 births
Living people
Commonwealth Games gold medallists for Australia
Boxers at the 2006 Commonwealth Games
Boxers at the 2008 Summer Olympics
Olympic boxers of Australia
Australian Institute of Sport boxers
Australian male boxers
Commonwealth Games medallists in boxing
People from Moe, Victoria
Sportsmen from Queensland
21st-century Australian people
Medallists at the 2006 Commonwealth Games